Koy Sanjaq Jewish Neo-Aramaic is a dialect of Northeastern Neo-Aramaic in the Inter-Zab Jewish Neo-Aramaic cluster. All speakers migrated to Israel in 1951 and as of 1985, the language was being acquired by children raised in Shtula, a moshav in Israel.

Phonology

References

Sources

Jewish Northeastern Neo-Aramaic dialects
Koy Sanjaq